Jean Thuillier (12 October 1921 – 22 August 2017) was a French novelist and medical doctor. He wrote a number of books, and won the Prix Littré and the Prix Méditerranée among others. Thuillier died in August 2017 at the age of 95.

Selected works
 Franz Anton Mesmer ou l’Extase magnétique (Phébus - 2004)
 Kim En Joong Peintre de lumière (Le Cerf - 2004)
 Les dix ans qui ont changé la folie (Robert Laffont - 1981)
 Les dix ans qui ont changé la folie, la dépression et l'angoisse (Erès - 2003)
 Dictionnaire des médicaments et leur bon usage (Robert Laffont - 1999)
 La Vierge du Cap (Rivages - 1996)
 Le Rêve de Charlus (Le Rocher - 1995)
 Monsieur Charcot de la Salpêtrière (Robert Laffont - 1993) (Prix Clio et Emile Roux d'Histoire 1993)
 Campo Morto (José Corti - 1992) (Prix Méditerranée 1993)
 La Révolution des tranquilisants (Renaudot - 1988)
 La folie. histoire et dictionnaire (Robert Laffond - 1992)
 Le paria du Danube (Balland - 1884) (Prix Littré 1984)

References

1921 births
2017 deaths
20th-century French novelists
21st-century French novelists
French male novelists
French medical writers
20th-century French male writers
21st-century French male writers
French male non-fiction writers